Gayley is a surname. Notable people with the surname include:

Charles Mills Gayley (1858–1932), American English professor and academic administrator
James Gayley (1855–1920), American chemist and steel metallurgist

See also
Dayley
Hayley